Uhuru (Swahili: freedom) were a South African musical group best known for producing the hit single "Khona" performed by Mafikizolo. Signed to Kalawa Jazmee, the band consisted of Nqobile Mahlanu (Mapiano), Sihle Dlalisisa (DJ Clap), Xelimpilo Simelane (Xeli) and Themba Sekowe (DJ Maphorisa). Independently, Uhuru is best known for hit remixes like "Y-tjukutja" and "The Sound".

Background 
Prior to collaborating in 2012, Mapiano and Xeli were friends who were into playing contemporary African jazz in Soshanguve where they originated from. The band members were signed through DJ Clap who was already an artiste signed to Kalawa Jazmee Records. Uhuru manages artwork and production in house as DJ Clap, Mapiano and Xeli mainly act as DJ, pianist and vocalist respectively.

Career 
Uhuru shot into limelight in 2013 after the release of the chart-topping single titled "Y-tjukutja", which went on to be dubbed as the song of the year for 2013 in South Africa. The producers also featured in "Khona", a song which topped many music charts and won several awards in South Africa and beyond including the 2014 MTV Africa Music Awards. In 2015, the collaborating artists undertook solo ambitions. By 2016, the Uhuru brand underwent serious challenges and incorporated a new face. Later in 2016, Uhuru released "Own Devices", "The Sound (Remix)" and Free Prophecy, Vol 1. under new management, putting to rest rumoured band break-ups.

Band members

Current roster 
 (Uhuru is no longer active)

Former acts

Discography

Selected singles 

 "Pata Pata" (2012)
 "Work" (2012)
 "Pepe" (2012)
 "Not Yet Uhuru" (2012)
 "Umraro" (2012)
 "Follow" (2012)
 "Ketsetse" (2013)
 "Thathi Sgubhu" (2013)
 "Ungowami" (2013)
 "Sweety Mabhebeza" (2013)
 "Y-tjukutja" (2013)
 "Raindrops" (2014)
 "Nne" (2014)
 "Kumi Na Mbili" (2014)
 "Kumi Na Tatu" (2014)
 "Nane" (2014)
 "Kumi" (2014)
 "Unity ina Diversity" (2015)
 "Duze" (2015)
 "Shoota Babylone (2015)
 "Circles" (2015)

As featured artists 

 "Khona" – Mafikizolo ft. Uhuru (2013)
 "Speaker" – Professor ft. Oskido and Uhuru
 "Move" – Becca ft. Uhuru (2014)
 "Nakupenda" – Mafikizolo ft. Uhuru (2014)
 "Komolop Cholop" – MC Galaxy ft. Uhuru (2015)
 "The Sound" – Davido ft. Uhuru (2015)
 "The Banger" – Runtown ft. Uhuru (2015)
 "The Sound (Remix)" – Davido ft. G-Eazy and Uhuru (2016)

Albums 
 Symbiose (2006)
 Not Yet (2012)
 Our Father (2013)
 Safari (2014)
 Free Prophecy, Vol 1. (2016)

Awards and nominations 
2013 Song of the Year Award
Nominated for 'Best Electronic Act' at the Unsigned Music Awards (UMA's) Troxy Theatre London, 2016

See also 
 List of South African musicians

References

External links 
 

South African musical groups
South African musicians